Evaristus Thatho Bitsoane (September 17, 1938 – July 17, 2010) was the Roman Catholic bishop of the Roman Catholic Diocese of Qacha's Nek, Lesotho.

Ordained to the priesthood on December 19, 1964 for the Qacha's Nek Diocese, Bitsoane was appointed bishop of the diocese on July 17, 1981 and was ordained on October 11, 1981. He died in office.

Notes

1938 births
2010 deaths
Lesotho Roman Catholic bishops
Roman Catholic bishops of Qacha's Nek